Conrad Manila is a hotel located at the Bay City area in Pasay, Metro Manila, Philippines.

Design and construction
The design of the building occupied by the Conrad Manila was inspired by the cruise ships passing by Manila Bay. Conrad Manila was designed by WOW Architects. The firm was also responsible for the interior design of the building.

On March 7, 2013, SM Hotels and Conventions Corporation announced that they reached an agreement with Hilton Worldwide, the operator of the Conrad Hotels hotel brand, that the SM subsidiary would manage Conrad Manila. The opening of the hotel, then planned to have 350 rooms, was initially scheduled for mid-2015. It was later reported that Hilton Worldwide would manage Conrad Manila, which would be owned by the SM subsidiary.

The hotel opened on June 15, 2016, and was marked with a ribbon-cutting ceremony. However, the formal opening of the hotel was scheduled in September 2016. It is estimated that  was spent for the construction of the hotel building.

Features
The hotel occupies the top eight floors of the building while the first two floors are occupied by S Maison, a retail complex. A one-floor basement parking is also found below S Maison and is accessible through Ocean Drive, with an exit at Coral Way. Two direct walkways connect the hotel building to the SMX Convention Center Manila. The hotel is owned by SM Hotels and Conventions Corporation, a subsidiary of SM Investments Corporation, while it is managed by the Hilton Worldwide as part of its Conrad Hotels brand.

At the time the hotel opened, there were 347 rooms and suites. Six restaurants and lounges are likewise hosted at the hotel. A fitness center and spa operating around the clock and an infinity pool are also among the hotel's features.

S Maison
The S Maison retail space occupies the first two floors of the Conrad Manila, hosting 69 retail spaces. It also hosts a Director's Club Cinema with three theaters, each having a seating capacity of 38 people, installed by La-Z-Boy. The retail space launched in June 2017 is considered by SM Prime Holdings to be its 62nd SM Supermall in the country.

Malherbe, a French design firm, was responsible for the interior design of the S Maison, which is described as patterned after the concept of "Pearl of the Orient". The tenant mix of the S Maison is described as "43 percent food and 57 percent retail". Tenants include Hard Rock Cafe Manila, Starbucks Reserve, museums such as the Dessert Museum, and various art galleries and exhibits.

Dessert Museum

The Dessert Museum has eight rooms which focuses on sweets and desserts and a souvenir shop inside. It is located on the ground floor of S Maison.

Features

Lakbay Museo 

Lakbay Museo was an "interactive millennial museum" at the Conrad Manila and was considered as its first kind in the Philippines. Opened on July 12, 2019, it had art installations and 14 unique experiences from 11 different destinations around Luzon, Visayas and Mindanao. It also had a souvenir shop where visitors can buy pasalubong from different provinces of the Philippines. It was also located at the ground floor of S Maison. It closed by the end of July 2022.

Reception
Prior to its opening date, the Conrad Manila was awarded at the 4th Annual Philippine Property Awards in April 2016. The establishment is the recipient of three awards, namely Best Hotel Development, Best Hotel Architectural Design, and Best Hotel Interior Design.

At the 2017 Prix Versailles World Architecture Awards held at the UNESCO Headquarters in Paris, the S Maison was recognized for design excellence in the Interior Spaces, South Asia and the Pacific Shopping Malls category.

References

External links
Conrad Manila Official Website
S Maison  SM Supermalls

SM Mall of Asia
Hilton Hotels & Resorts hotels
Hotels in Metro Manila
Hotel buildings completed in 2016
2016 establishments in the Philippines
Buildings and structures in Pasay